A fen (Cantonese: sin []), is a unit of currency used in Greater China, including the People's Republic of China, the Republic of China (Taiwan), Hong Kong (called a cent in English) and Macao (called an avo in Portuguese).

Renminbi were issued in coin denominations of 1, 2, and 5 fen and also banknote denominations of 1, 2, and 5 fen.

References

Currencies of China